The Universal Language (Esperanto: La Universala Lingvo) is a 2011 short documentary film on the Esperanto language and the movement around it. Using much archive footage from the language's early days, as well as interviews with Esperantists today, the film constructs a linear narrative of Esperanto's history and goals.

The film, directed by Sam Green won the 2012 Ashland Independent Film Festival award for Juried Best Short Documentary.

References

External links

The Universal Language on Vimeo

2011 films
2011 short documentary films
Esperanto-language films
American short documentary films
Documentary films about words and language
Films directed by Sam Green
2010s English-language films
2010s American films